The Lonely Robot is an EP by American synthpop group Future Bible Heroes, released on January 21, 2003 in the United States on Instinct Records. It consists of five remixes of songs that originally appeared on the Future Bible Heroes' 2002 album Eternal Youth, as well as two new songs.

Track listing
The DJ From Outer Space	
Losing Your Affection (Client On Demand Mix)
The World Is A Disco Ball (Rob Rives Club Mix)
Losing Your Affection (Sunroof Mix)
I'm A Vampire (Extended Mix)
Losing Your Affection (Soft Cell 12-Inch Mix)
The Lonely Robot

Personnel
Christopher Ewen – mixing
Gareth Jones – producer, remixing
Daniel Miller – producer, remixing
Rob Rives – producer, remixing
Ingo Vauk – producer, remixing

References

2003 EPs
Future Bible Heroes albums
Instinct Records albums